Fairmont Butte is a butte of volcanic origins in the Antelope Valley just west of the City of Lancaster, California in Los Angeles County. Summit elevation is 3,130 feet above sea level. Parts of Fairmont Butte are situated within the boundaries of Antelope Valley California Poppy Reserve.

During construction of the Los Angeles Aqueduct, the City of Los Angeles found deposits of Tuff at Fairmont Butte that closely resembled German Trass and Italian Pozzolana and was an ideal ingredient to blend and use in the production of cement. The City constructed a quarry and regrinding plant at the base of Fairmont Butte to excavate the tuff, grind and blend it with Portland cement which was used in the construction of the aqueduct's Mojave conduit.

See also 
Natural history of the Mojave Desert

References

Gallery

Antelope Valley
Geography of Palmdale, California
Landforms of Kern County, California
Buttes of California